162. Fighter Escadrille was a unit of the Polish Air Force at the start of the Second World War. The unit was attached to the Łódź Army.

Equipment
10 PZL P.7a fighter airplanes.

Air Crew
Commanding officer: por. pil. Bernard Groszewski
Deputy Commander: por. pil. Jan Wiśniewski

Pilots:
 ppor. pil. Czesław Główczyński
 ppor. pil. Zbigniew Szubert
 ppor. pil. Zdzisław Zadroziński
 pchor. pil. Antoni Dzięgielewski
 pchor. pil. Franciszek Kornicki
 pchor. pil. Ryszard Łopacki
 kpr. pil. Kazimierz Kobusiński
 kpr. pil. Jan Malinowski
 kpr. pil. Jan Rogowski 
 kpr. pil. Zdzisław Urbańczyk
 st. szer. pil. Tadeusz Andruszków
 st. szer. pil. Zbigniew Brzeźniak
 st. szer. pil. Michał Krzyszowski

See also
Polish Air Force order of battle in 1939

References
 

Polish Air Force escadrilles